Sirintra Saengsakaorat (born 18 November 1996) is a Thai cricketer. She played for the Thailand women's national cricket team in the 2017 Women's Cricket World Cup Qualifier in February 2017. In June 2018, she was named in Thailand's squad for the 2018 ICC Women's World Twenty20 Qualifier tournament. She made her Women's Twenty20 International (WT20I) debut for Thailand on 3 June 2018, in the 2018 Women's Twenty20 Asia Cup.

References

External links
 

1996 births
Living people
Sirintra Saengsakaorat
Place of birth missing (living people)
Cricketers at the 2014 Asian Games
Sirintra Saengsakaorat
Southeast Asian Games medalists in cricket
Sirintra Saengsakaorat
Competitors at the 2017 Southeast Asian Games
Sirintra Saengsakaorat